CMLL Super Viernes is professional wrestling promotion Consejo Mundial de Lucha Libre's (CMLL) Friday night wrestling show that takes place in Arena México. The show is held every Friday night unless a Pay-Per-View or a supercard wrestling event is scheduled to take place on that night. CMLL began holding their weekly Friday night "Super Viernes" shows as far back as 1938 and continued the tradition through 2019. Some of the matches from Super Viernes were taped for CMLL's weekly shows that air in Mexico and the United States on various channels in the weeks following the Super Viernes show. The Super Viernes events featured a number of professional wrestling matches, in which some wrestlers were involved in pre-existing scripted feuds or storylines and others were teamed up with no backstory reason as such. Wrestlers themselves portrayed either "Rudos" or fan favorites ("Tecnicos" in Mexico) as they competed in matches with pre-determined outcomes.

CMLL presented a total of 49 Super Viernes shows. The only Fridays in 2019 to not feature a Super Viernes show was when CMLL held one of their signature events instead, which were annual Homenaje a Dos Leyendas, Juicio Final, and the CMLL 86th Anniversary Show. Super Viernes also hosted most of the major CMLL annual tournaments, which in 2019 included the, Torneo Gran Alternativa, Torneo de Parejas Increibles, the Universal Championship, Copa Dinastias, International Gran Prix, and La Copa Junior. The show also features a number of high-profile championship matches, a total of eight championship matches, with the NWA World Historic Welterweight Championship changed hands twice while both the CMLL World Tag Team Championship and CMLL World Trios Championship both change hands once. Super Viernes also saw successful defenses of the Mexican National Heavyweight Championship, CMLL World Middleweight Championship, the Rey del Inframundo title and the CMLL World Trios Championship.

Super Viernes shows of 2019

Footnotes

References

2019 in professional wrestling
Professional wrestling-related lists
2019